U or u, is the twenty-first and sixth-to-last letter and fifth vowel letter of the Latin alphabet, used in the modern English alphabet, the alphabets of other western European languages and others worldwide. Its name in English is u (pronounced ), plural ues.

History
U derives from the Semitic waw, as does F, and later, Y, W, and V. Its oldest ancestor goes to Egyptian hieroglyphics, and is probably from a hieroglyph of a mace or fowl, representing the sound [v] or the sound [w]. This was borrowed to Phoenician, where it represented the sound [w], and seldom the vowel [u].

In Greek, two letters were adapted from the Phoenician waw. The letter was adapted, but split in two, with the first one of the same name (Ϝ) being adapted to represent [w], and the second one being Upsilon, which was originally adapted to represent [u], later fronted, becoming [y].

In Latin, a stemless variant shape of the upsilon was borrowed in early times as U, taking the form of modern-day V — either directly from the Western Greek alphabet or from the Etruscan alphabet as an intermediary — to represent the same  sound, as well as the consonantal , num — originally spelled NVM — was pronounced  and via was pronounced .
During the late Middle Ages, two forms of U developed, which were both used for /v/ or the vowel /u/. The pointed form 'V' was written at the beginning of a word, while a rounded form 'U' was used in the middle or end, regardless of sound. So whereas 'valour' and 'excuse' appeared as in modern printing, 'have' and 'upon' were printed 'haue' and 'vpon', respectively. The first recorded use of 'U' and 'V' as distinct letters is in a Gothic alphabet from 1386, where 'V' preceded 'U'. Printers eschewed capital 'V' and 'U' into the 17th century and the distinction between the two letters was not fully accepted by the French Academy until 1762. The rounded variant became the modern-day version of U and its former pointed form became V.

Pronunciation and use

English
In English, the letter  has four main pronunciations. There are "long" and "short" pronunciations. Short , found originally in closed syllables, most commonly represents  (as in 'duck'), though it retains its old pronunciation  after labial consonants in some words (as in 'put') and occasionally elsewhere (as in 'sugar'). Long , found originally in words of French origin (the descendant of Old English long u was respelled as ), most commonly represents  (as in 'mule'), reducing to  after  (as in 'rule'),  (as in 'June') and sometimes (or optionally) after  (as in 'lute'), and after additional consonants in American English (see do–dew merger).

Additionally, the letter  is used in text messaging, Internet and other written slang to denote 'you', by virtue of both being pronounced .

One thing to note is that certain varieties of the English language (i.e. British English, Canadian English, etc.) use the letter U in words such as colour, labour, valour, etc.; however, in American English the letter is not used and said words mentioned are spelled as color and so on. It is the thirteenth most frequently used letter in the English language, with a frequency of about 2.8% in words.

Other languages
In most languages that use the Latin alphabet,  represents the close back rounded vowel  or a similar vowel.

In Welsh orthography the letter can represent a long close front unrounded vowel or short near-close near-front unrounded vowel  in Southern dialects.

Other uses
The symbol 'U' is the chemical symbol for uranium.

In the context of Newtonian mechanics 'U' is the symbol for the potential energy of a system.

'u' is the symbol for the atomic mass unit and 'U' is the symbol for one enzyme unit.

In the International Phonetic Alphabet, the close back rounded vowel is represented by the lower case ⟨u⟩.

U is also the source of the mathematical symbol ∪, representing a union. It is used mainly for Venn diagrams and geometry.

It is used as for micro- in metric measurements as a replacement for the Greek letter μ (mu), of which it is a graphic approximation when that Greek letter is not available, as in "um" for μm (micrometer).

Some universities, such as the University of Miami and the University of Utah, are locally known as "The U".

U is also used the letter in the coat of arms/flag of the Ustaše.

U is an honorific in Burmese.

Related characters

Ancestors, descendants and siblings
𐤅: Semitic letter Waw, from which the following symbols originally derive
 υ : Greek letter Upsilon, from which U derives
V v : Latin letter V, descended from U
W w : Latin letter W, descended frm V/U
Y y : Latin letter Y, also descended from Upsilon
У у : Cyrillic letter U, which also derives from Upsilon
Ү ү : Cyrillic letter Ue
Ϝ ϝ : Greek letter Digamma
F f : Latin letter F, derived from Digamma
IPA-specific symbols related to U:  
Uralic Phonetic Alphabet-specific symbols related to U:

Teuthonista phonetic transcription-specific symbols related to U:

ᶸ : Modifier letter small capital u is used for phonetic transcription
Ꞿ ꞿ : Glottal U, used in the transliteration of Ugaritic
U with diacritics: Ŭ ŭ Ʉ ʉ ᵾ ᶶ Ꞹ  ꞹ Ụ ụ Ü ü Ǜ ǜ Ǘ ǘ Ǚ ǚ Ǖ ǖ Ṳ ṳ Ú ú Ù ù Û û Ṷ ṷ Ǔ ǔ Ȗ ȗ Ű ű Ŭ ŭ Ư ư Ứ ứ  Ừ ừ Ử ử Ự ự Ữ Ữ Ủ ủ Ū ū Ū̀ ū̀ Ū́ ū́ Ṻ ṻ Ū̃ ū̃ Ũ ũ Ṹ ṹ Ṵ ṵ ᶙ Ų ų Ų́ ų́ Ų̃ ų̃ Ȕ ȕ Ů ů

Ligatures and abbreviations
∪ : Union
∩ : Intersection, an upside-down upper case "U"

Computing codes

 1

Other representations

References

External links

Vowel letters
ISO basic Latin letters